Rodrigo Duterte assumed office as President of the Philippines on June 30, 2016, and his term ended on June 30, 2022. This article is a list of administration and Cabinet members in his presidency.

On May 31, 2016, a few weeks before his presidential inauguration, Duterte named his Cabinet members, which comprised a diverse selection of former military generals, childhood friends, classmates, and leftists. Following his presidential inauguration, he administered a mass oath-taking for his Cabinet officials, and held his first Cabinet meeting on June 30.

During his tenure, he appointed several retired military generals and police directors to the Cabinet and other government agencies, stressing they are honest and competent. He initially offered four executive departments to left-leaning individuals, who later resigned, were fired, or rejected by the Commission on Appointments after relations between the government and the communist rebels deteriorated. He fired several Cabinet members and officials linked to corruption, but has been accused by critics of "recycling" people he fired when he reappointed some of them to other government positions. Admitting he is not an economist, he appointed several technocrats in his Cabinet, which he relied upon on economic affairs. In February 2022, a few months before leaving office, he said he got the "best minds" in his Cabinet, whom he praised for their good works, and expressed his willingness to pass his Cabinet members to the succeeding administration for the benefit of the people.

Administration and cabinet

Changes

2016

2017

2018

2019

2020

2021

2022

Notes

References

Presidency of Rodrigo Duterte